Deux sonnets de Jean Cassou is a song cycle for baritone and piano written by the French composer Henri Dutilleux in 1954. He later transcribed or allowed transcriptions of the work for various ensembles.

It is based on poems written by Jean Cassou when he was a prisoner of war. It has been championed by major singers like Gérard Souzay,  and more recently Renée Fleming.

Background 
Jean Cassou was the first Chief Conservator of the Musée National d'Art Moderne. He was dismissed from his post by the Vichy government in 1940 and subsequently joined the Résistance. As a result, he was arrested and, while in prison, he conceived Trente-trois sonnets composés au secret (Thirty-three sonnets composed in solitary confinement) which he had to memorize since he was denied pen and paper. They were clandestinely published in 1944.

Songs 
Dutilleux first encountered Cassou's poems in 1944, shortly after they were published. Ten years later, he reread them and decided to set to music two of them, for baritone and piano: "Il n'y avait que des troncs déchirés" (There was nothing but torn trunks) and "J'ai rêvé que je vous portais entre mes bras" (I dreamed that I carried you in my arms). The songs are markedly contrasted. The first one is violent and depicts a ruined castle, the second one is calm and dream-like, a remembrance of past love.

Sonnet 8
Il n'y avait que des troncs déchirés,
que couronnaient des vols de corbeaux ivres,
et le chäteau était couvert de givre,
ce soir de fer où je me présentai.

Je n'avais plus avec moi ni mes livres,
ni ma compagne, l'âme, et ses péchés,
ni cette enfant qui tant rêvait de vivre
quand je l'avais sur terre rencontrée.

Les murs étaient blanchis au lait de sphinge
et les dalles rougies au sang d'Orphée.
Des mains sans grâce avaient tendu des linges

Aux fenêtres borgnes comme des fées.
La scène était prête pour des acteurs
fous et cruels à force de bonheur.

Sonnet 4
J'ai rêvé que vous portais entre mes bras,
depuis la cour jusqu'à votre salon obscur.
Vous sembliez une soeur des chères créatures
que j'adore, mais je ne vous connaissais pas.

Il faisait une nuit de lune et de frimas,
une nuit de la vie, sonore d'aventures.
Tandis que je cherchais à voir votre figure,
je vous sentais légère et tremblante de foi.

Puis je vous ai perdue comme tant d'autres choses,
la perle de secrets et le safran des roses,
que le songe ou la terre offrirent à mon coeur.

Signes de ma mémoire, énigmes, tout me mène,
avec chaque soleil formé à si grand peine,
au chef-d'oeuvre d'une fort et lucide malheur.

Transcriptions 
In the mid-1990s, Dutilleux orchestrated the song-cycle. Chandos Records released the premier recording of the orchestrated version in 1996.

In 2011, Pascal Gallois transcribed it for bassoon and piano with the composer's approval. The transcription was played at the Hôtel de Lauzun in presence of the composer.

Dutilleux transcribed both songs for soprano and orchestra for Renée Fleming who recorded them in 2012 on her album Poèmes.

Other Cassou sonnets set to music by Dutilleux 
Dutilleux discovered Cassou's poems in 1944 and immediately wrote "La Geôle" (The Jail) for voice and orchestra based on one of them.

In 1954, he set "Eloignez-vous" (Walk away) to music, along with "Il n'y avait que des troncs déchirés" and "J'ai rêvé que je vous portais entre mes bras". Although the three poems were premièred together, "Eloignez-vous" was not included in the cycle and only resurfaced in April 2011.

Dutilleux had this to say about his work on Cassou's poems:

References

External links 
 "Dutilleux et les 'Sonnets' résistants de Jean Cassou" by Caroline Potter, dutilleux2016.com (in French)

1954 compositions
Compositions by Henri Dutilleux
Classical song cycles in French
Song cycles by Henri Dutilleux